Deh Now-ye Sofla (also Romanized as Deh Now-ye Soflá and Dehnow-e Soflá; also known as Deh-e Now-e Pā’īn and  Deh Now Pā’īn) is a village in Naghan Rural District, Naghan District, Kiar County, Chaharmahal and Bakhtiari Province, Iran. At the 2006 census, its population was 24, in 5 families. The village is populated by Lurs.

References 

Populated places in Kiar County
Luri settlements in Chaharmahal and Bakhtiari Province